Betomasthem (Greek: Βαıτομασθαίμ, Baitomasthaim) or Betomestham (Βετομεσθαίμ, Betomesthaim) is an unidentified town from the Book of Judith.

Betomasthem is a place mentioned only in the apocryphal Book of Judith, as a town "over against Esdraelon, facing the plain that is near Dothaim", and in the vicinity of "Bebai, Chobai, and Cola, in the coasts of Israel". From the manner of its mention, it would seem to have been of equal importance with Bethulia itself, but it is doubtful whether it indicates any historical locality whatever. It can hardly be Deir Massīn, which lies west of "the plain that is near Dothan". The district is clearly indicated, but no identification has been possible.

References

Sources 

Attribution:

Ancient Israel and Judah
Places in the deuterocanonical books
Book of Judith